Hundålvatnet is a lake that lies in the municipality of Vefsn in Nordland county, Norway. It is located just north of the Lomsdal–Visten National Park. The lake flows into the Hundåla river which flows north into the Vefsnfjorden.

See also
 List of lakes in Norway
 Geography of Norway

References

Vefsn
Lakes of Nordland